Richard Van Zant (November 1864 – August 6, 1912) was an American third baseman in Major League Baseball. Nicknamed "Foghorn Dick", he played 10 games for the Cleveland Blues during the 1888 season. He died in 1912 and is buried in Earlham Cemetery in Richmond, Indiana.

External links

1864 births
1912 deaths
19th-century baseball players
Major League Baseball third basemen
Cleveland Blues (1887–88) players
Duluth Jayhawks players
Kalamazoo Kazoos players
Wheeling National Citys players
Wheeling Nailers (baseball) players
Springfield Senators players
Burlington Babies players
Tacoma (minor league baseball) players
Burlington Hawkeyes players
Spokane Bunchgrassers players
San Francisco Friscos players
San Francisco Metropolitans players
Menominee (minor league baseball) players
Baseball players from Indiana
Sportspeople from Richmond, Indiana